The Ambassador of the Republic of the Philippines to the Democratic Republic of Timor-Leste is the Republic of the Philippines' foremost diplomatic representative in East Timor. As head of the Philippines' diplomatic mission there, the Ambassador is the official representative of the President and the Government of the Philippines to the President and Government of East Timor. The position has the rank and status of an Ambassador Extraordinary and Plenipotentiary and is based at the embassy located in Dili, the capital of the country.

Heads of mission

See also
East Timor–Philippines relations

References

External links

Philippines
East Timor